Ukraine competed at the 2015 European Games, in Baku, Azerbaijan from 12 to 28 June 2015.

Medalists

Competitors 
Ukraine was represented by 240 athletes in 15 sports. Ukraine did not compete in athletics since it was combined with the European Team Championships Third League competition and Ukraine was at that time in the Super League division. Ukraine was represented by the maximum number of athletes in archery, beach soccer, diving, gymnastics, synchronised swimming, table tennis, triathlon and wrestling.

Archery

Ukraine achieved maximum quotas. Men's team qualified through the performance at the 2014 European Archery Championships in Echmiadzin and women's team through 2015 European Archery Grand Prix in Marathon. Ukraine was the only nation to win a medal in each team event, though it failed to win any individual medal.

Badminton

Ukraine was represented in all competitions.

Basketball 3x3

Ukraine did not qualify for the men's competition.

Women
 Viktoriia Paziuk
 Krystyna Matsko
 Olga Maznichenko
 Ganna Zarytska

Beach soccer

Ukraine qualified through the 2014 Euro Beach Soccer League by placing 6th in Division A.

Men

 Kostiantyn Andrieev
 Andrii Borsuk
 Ihor Borsuk
 Oleh Budzko
 Volodymyr Hladchenko
 Oleksandr Korniychuk
 Dmytro Medvid
 Roman Pachev
 Viktor Panteleychuk
 Vitalii Sydorenko
 Dmytro Voitenko
 Oleh Zborovskyi

Boxing

Ukraine qualified a male in each category. In women's boxing, Ukraine managed to qualify only in two categories out of five.

Men

Women

Canoe sprint

Ukraine did not compete in men's C-1 1000 m and K-4 1000 m.

Men

Women

Cycling 

Ukraine did not compete in women's BMX.

Road
Men

Women

Mountain bike

BMX

Diving

Ukraine was represented in all event by the maximum number of athletes.

Men

Women

Fencing

Ukraine did not manage to qualify a team in men's competition, since only Top-5 or Top-6 (considering the host quota) in FIE Official Team Ranking were able to qualify, but all male competitors as well as Olga Leleyko and Yana Shemyakina qualified through FIE Official Individual Ranking without the need to compete in the Qualification Tournament.

Andriy Yahodka unexpectedly became the champion, while Olha Kharlan failed to qualify even for knock-out stage.

Men's

Women's

Gymnastics

Ukraine was represented in all events and had maximum number of quotas.

Acrobatic
Ukraine qualified through the 2014 Acrobatic Gymnastics World Championships which was the only qualification criterion for the Games.
Women's groups

Mixed pairs

Aerobic
Ukraine qualified a total of six athletes after the performance at the 2013 Aerobic Gymnastics European Championships. One gymnast from pairs had to compete in the group event making the total athletes to 6.

Artistic
At the Games, Ukrainian male gymnasts managed to qualify for all apparatus finals (the limitation was one competitor from a country in a final) while no Ukrainian female athlete got to any apparatus final.

Men
Team all-around and individual qualifications

All-around

Apparatus finals

Women
Team all-around and individual qualifications

All-around

Rhythmic
Ukraine qualified two athletes for individual competition and a group after the performance at the 2013 Rhythmic Gymnastics European Championships.

At the Games, Hanna Rizatdinova also managed to qualify for all apparatus finals. Viktoria Mazur was a reserve athlete.

All-around final and apparatus qualification

Apparatus finals

Group all-around and qualification

Group finals

Trampoline
Ukraine qualified two athletes based on the results at the 2014 European Trampoline Championships. The gymnasts competed in both the individual and the synchronized event.

Judo

Ukraine was not represented in the men's 60 kg, women's 57 kg, women's 63 kg, women's 70 kg and women's team.

Men

Women

Karate

Ukrainian athletes managed to qualify for just 3 out of 12 events in karate. Ukraine was represented only in kumite competitions. 

Men

Women

Sambo

Ukrainian athletes competed in 6 out of 8 events (except for women's 52 kg and women's 60 kg).

Men

Women

Shooting

Ukraine athletes managed to qualify for almost all events with the exception of men's trap, men's double trap, women's trap and, respectively, mixed team trap. Ukraine was represented in majority of events by two shooters, except for both men's and women's skeet competitions as well as women's 25 metre pistol.

Though Ukrainian athletes reached several finals, they failed to win a medal. Ukraine became together with the Czech Republic the biggest team in shooting that has not won a medal.

Swimming

Ukraine did not compete in men's 1500 m freestyle, men's 100 m backstroke, women's 50 m freestyle, women's 100 m freestyle, women's 1500 m freestyle, women's 50 m butterfly, women's 100 m butterfly, women's 200 m butterfly, women's 4 × 100 m freestyle relay, women's 4 × 200 m freestyle relay.

Men

Women

Mixed

Synchronised swimming

Ukraine was represented in all events. Mariana Serikova and Oleksandra Filonenko were reserve athletes.

Table tennis

Ukraine qualified for all events and had maximum number of quotas.

Individual

Team

Taekwondo

Ukraine was not represented in all men's categories and women's 57 kg.

Women

Triathlon

Ukraine gained the maximum number of quotas.

Volleyball

Ukraine was represented in beach volleyball competitions only.

Water polo

Ukraine qualified a boys' team through 2015 European Games Qualification Tournament A in Nijverdal by finishing second behind Greece. Ukraine ranked 15th with only one victory against Malta.

Men
Team roster

 Kostiantyn Daviskiba
 Stanislav Dubelir
 Vladyslav Dulin
 Bohdan Dzyadyk
 Vladyslav Haliasovsky
 Denys Husakov
 Hryhoriy Kirochkin
 Mykola Leshchenko
 Vladyslav Muzhychuk
 Volodymyr Nechytailo
 Yuriy Panas
 Sava Popyk
 Pavlo Zimariov

Preliminary round — Group A

13–16th place semifinals

15th place game

Wrestling

Ukraine was represented in all events.

Men's freestyle

Greco-Roman

Women's freestyle

References

Nations at the 2015 European Games
European Games
2015